Gytis Sirutavičius (born 12 January 1983) is a Lithuanian professional basketball player.

External links 
 Eurobasket.com Profile
 Gytis Sirutavičius LKL.lt profile (English and Lithuanian)
 Gytis Sirutavičius BBL.net profile (English)

References 

1983 births
Living people
ALM Évreux Basket players
BC Dnipro players
BC Juventus players
BC Lietkabelis players
BC Nevėžis players
BC Pieno žvaigždės players
BC Prienai players
Lithuanian expatriate basketball people in France
Lithuanian men's basketball players
Shooting guards
Small forwards
Sportspeople from Panevėžys